Bossa Nova Jazz Samba is an album by saxophonist Bud Shank and pianist Clare Fischer released on the Pacific Jazz label, and is in the genre of bossa nova.

Track listing
All compositions by Clare Fischer, except as indicated
 "Samba da Borboleta" - 3:32
 "Illusao" - 3:22
 "Pensativa" - 3:28
 "Joao" - 3:54
 "Misty" (Erroll Garner) - 2:35
 "Que Mais?" - 3:56
 "Wistful Samba" - 4:16
 "Samba Guapo" - 4:20

Personnel 
Bud Shank - alto saxophone
Clare Fischer - piano
Ralph Pena - bass
Larry Bunker, Frank Guerrero, Milt Holland, Bob Neel - percussion

References 

1962 albums
Pacific Jazz Records albums
Bud Shank albums
Clare Fischer albums